is a municipality in Akershus in Viken county, Norway. A suburb of Oslo, it is part of the Oslo urban area and the traditional region of Romerike. The administrative centre of the municipality is the village of Lørenskog.  Lørenskog was separated from the municipality of Skedsmo on 1 January 1908.

General information

Name
The municipality (originally the parish) is named after the old (and no longer existent) Leirheimr farm.  The first element is leirr which means "clay" and the last element is heimr which means "homestead" or "farm". Thus: "the farm built on clay ground". The suffix skógr (meaning "wood") was added later, changing the meaning to "the woodlands around the farm Leirheimr". Prior to 1918, the name was spelled "Lørenskogen".

Heraldry
Lørenskog's arms date from modern times. Granted on 26 July 1957, they show a red waterwheel on a gold background. Water-driven sawmills were once an important part of the municipality's economy.

Lørenskog Church
Lørenskog Church (Lørenskog kirke) is a medieval era church. The building material was brick and quarried limestone. The church dates to ca. 1150. The church is of rectangular plan and has 140 seats. In 1608 the church received a pulpit. The west tower was made of wood and was erected in 1864. In the tower hangs two church bells, the larger made in 1874. Its walls are one meter thick, and the stones are held together with lime mortar.  The exterior and interior plaster was repaired during the 1600s and 1700s. In 1956 old plaster was removed and walls re-plastered and painted.  The current outward opening door was inserted in 1946.

Minorities

Geography
The municipality is located just east of the capital, Oslo, with many main roads going through it. Almost all the inhabitants live in the northern part of Lørenskog. The southern parts consist of forest, while farms and grain fields occupy the space in between.
An important train station, Lørenskog Station, is situated in the district. Within Lørenskog, Losby is known for its waterwheel, which is represented in the municipal coat-of-arms of Lørenskog.  Losby Golf and Country Club is located within the municipality.

Village
From 2006-2008, workers renovated the village of Lørenskog (the administrative center of the municipality), also called the "Metro Senter". This renovation includes a considerably larger shopping mall, a bus terminal with buses going in and out of Oslo every 15 minutes, possibly a future subway station, and the new Mailand Upper Secondary School.

Education
There are seven public elementary schools and four public high schools located in Kjenn, Hammer, Løkenåsen and Fjellsrud. In addition there are two Upper Secondary Schools, namely Lørenskog Upper Secondary School and Mailand Upper Secondary School.

Notable residents

 Aslam Ahsan (born 1942) a Pakistani Norwegian politician, elected to Lørenskog municipal council in 1983
 Trond Granlund (born 1950) rock and folk singer and composer; lives in Lørenskog
 Torgrim Sørnes (born 1956) physician, historian and author; lives in Lørenskog
 Frode Barth (born 1968 in Lørenskog) a Norwegian musician (guitar) and composer
 Marianne Aulie (born 1971 in Lørenskog) a Norwegian painter and former model
 Lise Myhre (born 1975 in Lørenskog) a Norwegian cartoonist
 Marianne Beate Kielland (born 1975 in Lørenskog) a Norwegian mezzo-soprano
 Ine Marie Eriksen Søreide (born 1976 in Lørenskog) politician, Minister of Defence (Norway) 2013/2017
 Ida S. Skjelbakken (born 1979 in Lørenskog) an author, illustrator and bodyguard
 Marit Larsen (born 1983 in Lørenskog) & Marion Raven (born 1984 in Lørenskog) singer/songwriters with the pop duo M2M
 Elisabeth Carew (born 1985 in Lørenskog) a Norwegian singer and songwriter
 Kirby Ann Basken  (born 1985 in Lørenskog) a Norwegian model, Miss Norway Universe 2007
 Kaja Norum (born 1989 in Lørenskog) a Norwegian model and figurativist painter
 Tom Hagen (born 1950) billionaire businessman, whose wife  disappeared mysteriously in 2018, dramatised for television as The Lørenskog Disappearance

Sport 

 Kjetil Siem (born 1960) journalist, author and sports official; Secretary-general of the Football Association of Norway, lives in Lørenskog
 Schirin Zorriassateiny (born 1964 in Lørenskog) a Norwegian rhythmic gymnast
 Trine Hattestad (born 1966 in Lørenskog) a retired javelin thrower, bronze and gold medallist at the 1996 & 2000 Summer Olympics
 Hege Riise (born 1969 in Lørenskog) a football coach and former player with 188 caps with Norway women
 Pål Grotnes (1977 in Lørenskog) a professional ice hockey goaltender
 John Carew (born 1979 in Lørenskog) former footballer with 365 club caps and 91 for Norway
 Ingrid Hjelmseth (born 1980 in Lørenskog) a former football goalkeeper with 361 club caps and 138 for Norway women
 Aksel Lund Svindal (born 1982 in Lørenskog) a former World Cup and Olympic medallist alpine ski racer
 Siren Sundby (born 1982 in Lørenskog) sailor, gold medallist at the 2004 Summer Olympics
 Christina Vukicevic (born 1987) a Norwegian former hurdler

Twin towns – sister cities

Lørenskog is twinned with:
 Garching bei München, Germany
 Järvenpää, Finland
 Rødovre, Denmark
 Täby, Sweden

References

External links

Municipal fact sheet from Statistics Norway

The Losby waterwheel

 
Municipalities of Akershus
Municipalities of Viken (county)
Villages in Akershus